Guido Maus (born 5 November 1964, Malmedy) is a Belgian-born gallery owner, gallerist, curator, and long-time collector of contemporary art. He is currently living and working in Birmingham, Alabama.

Gallery
In early 2010, Maus opened beta pictoris Gallery / Maus Contemporary dedicated to supporting contemporary creativity across the visual arts in photography, painting, sculpture and works on paper as well as mixed media, with a strong emphasis on issue-driven artwork and committed to experimentation and risk-taking. Through representing emerging, established, and internationally recognized artists, the gallery is committed to bringing a global perspective to contemporary issues and practices across the visual arts. The program consists of exhibitions, print publications, and media outreach.

The gallery represents the artists Jelili Atiku, John Bankston, Jarrod Beck, Steven Bindernagel, Manuel Caeiro, Willie Cole, Clayton Colvin, Derek Gracco, John Fields, Mark Flood, Peter Fox (artist), Irene Grau, Deborah Karpman, Barbara and Michael Leisgen, Sharon Louden, Odili Donald Odita, Sonja Rieger, Bayeté Ross Smith, Leslie Smith III, Susana Solano, Travis Somerville, Taravat Talepasand, Melissa Vandenberg, and the Estates of Eugene J. Martin and Yoshishige Furukawa.

beta pictoris gallery is a member of ICI, Independent Curators International (ICI), New York, a supporting member of The Birmingham Museum of Art, and its Collectors Circle for Contemporary Art, as well as its Sankofa Society, a support group for African and African-American Art. beta pictoris gallery is also a supporting member of the Museum of Contemporary Art Denver in Denver, Colorado and the Boulder Museum of Contemporary Art in Boulder, Colorado.

Gallery exhibits curated by Maus in beta pictoris gallery / Maus Contemporary have been reviewed in many art magazines and art blogs including Artforum, ARTslant, Square Cylinder Northern California Art, and Hyperallergic, among others.

Notes and references

External links
beta pictoris Gallery / Maus Contemporary Home Page Retrieved 2013-07-20.
3rd ArtPad iteration represents more than typical fare by Scott Jennings, June 2013 Retrieved 2013-07-20.
Emotionally charged exhibits on display at Beta Pictoris by Walter Lewellyn, January 2013 Retrieved 2013-07-20.
Everyone in the ArtPad, Artnet Magazine, May 2012 Retrieved 2013-07-20.
Art of the Urbane, Bhamarchitect's Blog, May 2010 Retrieved 2013-07-20.

1964 births
Living people
Belgian painters
Artists from Birmingham, Alabama
Postmodern artists
Belgian multimedia artists